The following is a sortable table of the 37 peaks of continental France with a topographical prominence of at least 1000 metres.

This table includes all Ultras with prominence of at least 1500m within continental France. Mountains located on islands and overseas departments are not included.

Mountains of continental France

References

Mountains
France

France
France